Kostadin Alakushev (c. 1875–1912) was a Bulgarian revolutionary of the Internal Macedonian-Adrianople Revolutionary Organization (IMARO).

Biography
Kostadin Alakushev was born in the village of Tarlis, in the Ottoman Empire, that is now in Greece known as Vathytopos, Kato Nevrokopi municipality, Drama regional unit. He graduated from the Bulgarian Men's High School of Thessaloniki and afterwards worked as a teacher in different villages in the region of Nevrokop and Ser. He became a member of the IMARO and participated in the Ilinden-Preobrazhenie Uprising in the revolutionary band of Stoyan Malchankov. In 1907 he became a member of the regional committee of the IMARO in Nevrokop. In 1909 he was a member of Yane Sandanski’s party, whose aim was to protect the Young Turk Revolution. In 1909 he participated in the foundation of a chapter of the People's Federative Party (Bulgarian Section) in Nevrokop. In 1908 Alakushev was among the founders of the Teachers' Association in Nevrokop, in 1911 he became a member of its executive committee and in 1912 he was a delegate at the 5th congress of the Union of Bulgarian Teachers in the Ottoman Empire.

In 1912, Alakushev was kidnapped together with Stoyko Pashkulev and Blagoy Meterov and killed in the vicinity of the village of Fotovishta (today known as Ognyanovo).

References
 Енциклопедия „Пирински край“. Том 1, Благоевград, 1995.

1870s births
1912 deaths
People from Kato Nevrokopi
People from Salonica vilayet
Members of the Internal Macedonian Revolutionary Organization
Bulgarians from Aegean Macedonia
Bulgarian revolutionaries
Bulgarian schoolteachers
Bulgarian Men's High School of Thessaloniki alumni